Quintus Julius Cordus was a Roman senator of the early Roman Empire, whose known career flourished under the reign of Vespasian. He was suffect consul in the nundinium of November-December AD 71 as the colleague of Gnaeus Pompeius Collega.

Cordus is known to have been governor of two provinces. The first one was the public province of Roman Cyprus, where an inscription records how he supervised the reconstruction of the theatre of Kourion after it was damaged in an earthquake. This inscription allows us to date his tenure to the year 65. The second province was Gallia Aquitania during the Year of Four Emperors, or AD 69. Despite its leading inhabitants taking an oath of allegiance to Otho, the province shifted its loyalty to the rival emperor Vitellius.

His life after he stepped down from the consulate is a blank.

References 

1st-century Romans
Suffect consuls of Imperial Rome
Roman governors of Cyprus
Roman governors of Gallia Aquitania
Cordus